Super Bowl IV was an American football game played on January 11, 1970 at Tulane Stadium in New Orleans, Louisiana. It was the fourth and final AFL–NFL World Championship Game in professional football prior to the AFL–NFL merger taking effect the following season. The American Football League (AFL) champion Kansas City Chiefs defeated the National Football League (NFL) champion Minnesota Vikings by the score of 23–7. This victory by the AFL squared the Super Bowl series with the NFL at two games apiece as the two leagues merged into one after the game.

Despite the AFL's New York Jets winning the previous season's Super Bowl, many sports writers and fans thought it was a fluke and continued to believe that the NFL was still superior to the AFL, and thus fully expected the Vikings to defeat the Chiefs; the Vikings entered the Super Bowl as 13½ point favorites. The Chiefs, who previously appeared in the first Super Bowl, finished the regular season at 11–3; they continued with two road wins in the AFL playoffs, dethroning the New York Jets 13–6, and then taking down division rival Oakland Raiders 17–7 in the final AFL title game.

Under wet conditions, the Chiefs defense dominated Super Bowl IV by limiting the Minnesota offense to only 67 rushing yards, forcing three interceptions, and recovering two fumbles. Kansas City's Len Dawson became the fourth consecutive winning quarterback to be named Super Bowl MVP. He completed 12 of 17 passes for 142 yards and one touchdown, with one interception. Dawson also recorded three rushing attempts for 11 yards.

Super Bowl IV is also notable for NFL Films miking up the Chiefs' Hank Stram during the game, the first time that a head coach had worn a microphone during a Super Bowl.

All seats for the game were priced at $15; the previous year's prices were $12, $8 and $6.

Background
The NFL awarded Super Bowl IV to New Orleans on March 19, 1969, at the owners' meetings held in Palm Springs, California. It marked the first of ten (as of 2022) Super Bowls to be held in New Orleans. Two cites were in consideration for the game, Miami being the other. After two consecutive Super Bowls played at the Miami Orange Bowl (II and III), owners by a roughly three-quarters vote, opted out of giving Miami the game for a third straight year. Some owners felt that since an AFL town had hosted the game two years in a row, that an NFL town should get another turn to balance out the hosting duties. New Orleans mayor Victor H. Schiro was joined by George W. Healy Jr. (editor of the Times-Picayune) and Al Hirt. They highlighted the superior seating capacity (80,982) of Tulane Stadium, as well as the local accommodations. Healy and Miami mayor Stephen P. Clark became locked in a debate during a press conference while the deliberation and voting was going on behind closed doors.

Minnesota Vikings

The Minnesota Vikings, led by head coach Bud Grant, entered the game with an NFL best 12–2 regular season record, leading the older league in total points scored (379) and fewest points allowed (133). They had scored 50 or greater points in three different games. They lost their first and last games of the season, but in between had 12 straight victories, the longest single-season winning streak in 35 years. Their defense, considered the most intimidating in the NFL, was anchored by a defensive line nicknamed the "Purple People Eaters", consisting of defensive tackles Gary Larsen and Alan Page, and defensive ends Carl Eller and Jim Marshall. The secondary was led by Bobby Bryant (8 interceptions, 97 return yards), Earsell Mackbee (6 interceptions, 100 return yards), and Paul Krause (5 interceptions, 82 return yards, 1 touchdown).

On offense, quarterback Joe Kapp was known for his superb leadership and his running ability, both throwing on the run and running for extra yards. And when Kapp did take off and run, instead of sliding when he was about to be tackled like most quarterbacks, he lowered his shoulder and went right at the tackler. This style of play earned him the nickname "Indestructible". In the NFL Championship Game against the Cleveland Browns, he collided with linebacker Jim Houston while running for a first down, and Houston had to be helped off the field after the play ended. Also, Kapp was known for being an extremely unselfish leader: when he was voted the Vikings Most Valuable Player, he turned the award down and said that every player on the team was equally valuable: "There is no one most valuable Viking. There are 40 most valuable Vikings."

Running back Dave Osborn was the team's top rusher with 643 yards and seven touchdowns. He also caught 22 passes for 236 yards and another touchdown. In the passing game, Pro Bowl wide receiver Gene Washington averaged 21.1 yards per catch by recording 821 yards and nine touchdowns from 39 receptions. Wide receiver John Henderson caught 34 passes for 553 yards and 5 touchdowns. The Vikings' offensive line was anchored by Pro Bowlers Grady Alderman and Mick Tingelhoff.

By winning the 1969 NFL Championship, the Vikings became the last possessors of the Ed Thorp Memorial Trophy.

Kansas City Chiefs

Meanwhile, it seemed that the Chiefs, led by head coach Hank Stram, and especially quarterback Len Dawson, were jinxed throughout the year. In the second game of the regular season, Dawson suffered a knee injury that kept him from playing the next six games.  Then in the following week, second string quarterback Jacky Lee went down for the season with a broken ankle in a loss to the Cincinnati Bengals. However, third string quarterback Mike Livingston engineered five wins of the next six starts, with Dawson coming off the bench in the second half of the sixth to clinch the win. The Chiefs (11–3) managed to finish in second place behind the Oakland Raiders (12–1–1) in the AFL's Western Division, after suffering a tough 10–6 loss to Oakland in the final game of the regular season. After that game, many sports writers and fans heavily criticized the team and Dawson for the poor play calling (Dawson called between 80 and 90 percent of the plays during the season).

After a 34–16 road win over the New York Jets on November 16, the Chiefs clinched a playoff spot at 9–1 with four games remaining. Wanting to set itself up more like the NFL right before the merger, the AFL expanded its 1969 playoffs to four teams, with the second place teams from each division traveling to play the first place teams from the other division (Western champion vs. Eastern runner-up, and vice versa). As a result of the new playoff format, many critics thought the Chiefs entered the playoffs through a "back-door" as the runner-up in the Western division. However, Dawson silenced the critics and led Kansas City to a strong finish with two road wins in the playoffs, defeating the defending champion Jets 13–6, and the Raiders (who had beaten them 41–6 in the previous year's postseason and twice in the 1969 season) 17–7 in the AFL Championship Game. This essentially made the Chiefs the first wild card team to play in the Super Bowl. (Dawson says he thinks both the Jets and the Raiders could have beaten the Vikings.)

Still, many people felt that Dawson's level of play in the AFL was not comparable to the NFL. Dawson himself had spent five seasons in the NFL as a backup before going to the AFL and becoming one of its top quarterbacks. "The AFL saved my career," said Dawson. In his 8 AFL seasons, he had thrown more touchdown passes (182) than any other professional football quarterback during that time. But because many still viewed the AFL as being inferior to the NFL, his records were not considered significant. Dawson's first chance to prove himself against an NFL team ended in failure, with his Chiefs losing 35–10 to the Green Bay Packers in Super Bowl I, reinforcing the notion that his success was only due to playing in the "inferior league".

Offensively, the Chiefs employed innovative formations and strategies designed by Stram to disrupt the timing and positioning of the defense. Besides Dawson, the Chiefs main offensive weapon was running back Mike Garrett (1965 Heisman Trophy winner), who rushed for 732 yards and 6 touchdowns. He also recorded 43 receptions for 432 yards and another 2 touchdowns. Running back Robert Holmes had 612 rushing yards, 266 receiving yards, and 5 touchdowns.  Running back Warren McVea rushed for 500 yards and 7 touchdowns, while adding another 318 yards returning kickoffs. In the passing game, wide receiver Otis Taylor caught 41 passes for 696 yards and 7 touchdowns.  The offensive line was anchored by AFL All-Stars Ed Budde and Jim Tyrer. According to Len Dawson, placekicker Jan Stenerud and punter Jerrel Wilson were the best kickers in football.  The offensive line was led by tackle Jim Tyrer, who was selected to his 6th AFL pro bowl.

The Chiefs defense led the AFL in fewest points allowed (177).  Like the Vikings, the Chiefs also had an outstanding defensive line, which was led by defensive tackles Buck Buchanan and Curley Culp, and defensive ends Jerry Mays and Aaron Brown. The Chiefs also had AFL All-Star linebacker Willie Lanier, who recorded 4 interceptions and 1 fumble recovery during the season. The Kansas City secondary was led by defensive backs Emmitt Thomas (9 interceptions for 146 return yards and a touchdown), Jim Kearney (5 interceptions for 154 return yards and a touchdown) and Johnny Robinson (8 interceptions for 158 return yards).

Kansas City's defense had shown their talent in the AFL title game when they defeated the Raiders.  Raiders quarterback Daryle Lamonica had completed 13 of 17 passes for 276 yards and a record setting 6 touchdowns in a 56–7 divisional rout of the Houston Oilers in their previous game, and had shredded the Chiefs with 347 yards and 5 touchdowns in their 41–6 win in the previous season's playoffs.  But in the 1969 AFL Championship Game, the Chiefs defense held him to just 15 of 39 completions and intercepted him 3 times in the fourth quarter.

This was the last Super Bowl appearance for the Chiefs, and their last championship, until Super Bowl LIV 50 years later.

Playoffs

Kansas City advanced to the Super Bowl with wins over the two previous AFL champions.  First they defeated the New York Jets in a defensive struggle 13–6, with Dawson's 61-yard completion to Taylor setting up the game winning score on his 19-yard touchdown pass to Gloster Richardson.  Kansas City held New York to just 234 yards and forced 4 turnovers.
The Chiefs then faced the Raiders, who took a 7–0 lead over them in the first quarter, but this would be their only score of the game.  Meanwhile, Dawson's 41-yard completion to Frank Pitts in the second quarter set up a 1-yard touchdown run by Wendell Hayes.  Then in the third quarter, Emmitt Thomas' clutch interception in the end zone and Dawson's long completion to Taylor sparked a 95-yard drive that ended with a touchdown run by Robert Holmes.  Kansas City went into the fourth quarter with a 14–7 lead, and held on for the win by forcing four turnovers (3 interceptions and a turnover on downs) in the final period.

Meanwhile, the ninth-year Vikings recorded their first postseason win in franchise history by defeating the Los Angeles Rams 23–20.  Though the Rams held the lead for most of the time in regulation, Kapp led a touchdown drive to give the team a 21–20 fourth quarter lead.  Eller made a key play to preserve the lead, sacking Rams quarterback (and 1969 NFL MVP) Roman Gabriel in the end zone for a safety and Alan Page intercepted a pass with thirty seconds remaining.

Then Minnesota quickly demolished the Cleveland Browns in the NFL championship game, jumping to a 24–0 halftime lead and going on to win 27–7. The Vikings offense gained 381 yards without turning the ball over, with Kapp passing for 169 yards and a touchdown, while Osborn rushed for 108 yards and Washington gained 125 yards on just 3 receptions.

Super Bowl pregame news and notes
Many sports writers and fans fully expected that the Vikings would easily defeat the Chiefs. Although the AFL's New York Jets won Super Bowl III at the end of the previous season, many were convinced that it was a fluke. They continued to believe that all of the NFL teams were far and away superior to all of the AFL teams.  And regardless of the differences among the leagues, the Vikings simply appeared to be a superior team.  Minnesota had the NFL's best record and outscored their opponents by 246 points, while Kansas City had not even won their own division.

Super Bowl IV provided another chance to show that Dawson belonged at the same level with all of the great NFL quarterbacks. But five days before the Super Bowl, news leaked that his name had been linked to a Detroit federal gambling investigation. Although Dawson was eventually cleared of any charges, the controversy added to the pressure he was already under while preparing for the game, causing him to lose sleep and concentration. "It was, beyond a doubt, the toughest week of my life," said Dawson.

Bud Grant became the first Super Bowl coach not to wear a tie. His counterpart, Hank Stram, wore a three-piece suit, with a red vest and a blazer with the Chiefs' helmet logo emblazoned on the breast pocket.

The attendance mark of 80,562 is the highest for the first four pre-merger Super Bowl games played.

Media coverage

Television
Super Bowl IV was broadcast in the United States by CBS with play-by-play announcer Jack Buck (his only Super Bowl on TV) and color commentator Pat Summerall, with Frank Gifford and Jack Whitaker reporting from the winning and losing locker rooms, respectively. While the game was sold out at Tulane Stadium, the NFL's unconditional blackout rules in place then prohibited the live telecast from being shown in the New Orleans area. After this season; Summerall would be transferred to work alongside Ray Scott when Scott's broadcast partner, Paul Christman, died on March 2, 1970. Additionally; this would be the last Super Bowl Gifford worked for CBS, as he would leave following the 1970 season to become the play-by-play announcer for Monday Night Football (Gifford would not work another Super Bowl until Super Bowl XIX; the first Super Bowl to air on ABC). 

CBS erased the videotape a few days after the game; the same thing they did with Super Bowls I and II, which they broadcast. Videotape was expensive then and networks did not believe old games were worth saving. The only reason this game exists is because the CBC and the French version on Radio-Canada in Canada and in Québec carried the broadcast and because the Vikings were located so close to Canada and had a lot of Canadian and Québec fans (and Bud Grant was a legendary player and coach in the CFL), the CBC decided to save it for their archives. As previously mentioned, as videotape was too expensive in those days to save, they transferred the footage to black & white film (kinescope). This therefore, enabled them to reuse the videotape.

44.27 million people in the US watched the game on television, resulting in a rating of 39.4 and a market share of 69.

Hank Stram and NFL Films
The night before the game, Ed Sabol of NFL Films met with Hank Stram and convinced Stram to wear a hidden microphone during the game so his comments could be recorded for the NFL Films Super Bowl IV film. They agreed the microphone would be kept secret. This would be the first time that a head coach had worn a microphone during a Super Bowl. This has led to one of the best-known and most popular of the NFL Films Super Bowl films due to the constant chatter and wisecracking of Stram. Ed Sabol had his number one sound man, Jack Newman – who also wired Vince Lombardi in a previous playoff game – place the microphone on Stram. Newman,  a multiple Emmy award-winning sound man and cameraman, shot Stram for the entire game as well as monitored the sound to make sure it continued to work. The success and popularity of this first Super Bowl wiring of a winning head coach led to 24 years of Newman continuing to wire players and coaches for NFL Films.

Some excerpts of Stram include:
 To Len Dawson: "C'mon Lenny! Pump it in there, baby! Just keep matriculating the ball down the field, boys!"
 Observing the confusion in the Vikings' defense: "Kassulke (Vikings strong safety Karl Kassulke) was running around there like it was a Chinese fire drill. They didn't know where Mike (Garrett) was. Didn't know where he was! They look like they're flat as hell."
 Before the Chiefs' first touchdown, he sent in the play "65 toss power trap." When the Chiefs scored on the play, Stram laughed while yelling to his players on the bench, "Was it there, boys? Was that there, rats? Nice going, baby! Haaa-haaa-haaa-ha-ha-ha! Haaa! The mentor! 65 toss power trap! Yaaa-haaa-haaa-ha-ha! Yaaa-ha-ha! I tell ya that thing was there, yes sir boys! Haa-ha-ha-ha-ha! Wooo!!"
 As the referees were spotting the ball before a measurement to determine if the Vikings got a first down, Stram yelled to the officials, "Make sure you mark it right! Oh, you lost your place! Measure it, take the chains out there! Oh, they didn't make it! My God, they made that by an inch! He definitely gave them an extra foot. Bad! Very bad!"
 Another time, the refs overruled what looked like a Minnesota fumble. Stram: "Mr. Official, let me ask you something. How can six of you miss a play like that? Huh? All six of you! When the ball jumped out of there as soon as we made contact?... No. What??"
 After Frank Pitts gained on the reverse in the third quarter, when the chains were stretched and the Chiefs indeed had the first down, Stram was then heard saying to the refs, "Ya did good, you marked it good. You did a helluva job, nice going!"
 On Otis Taylor's touchdown reception that clinched the game, Stram is heard yelling and laughing.
 In the fourth quarter, Stram congratulates Johnny Robinson and Willie Lanier following interceptions, as well as special teamer and reserve linebacker Bob Stein. 
 When reserve quarterback Mike Livingston goes in to relieve Dawson with the game in hand, Stram tells Dawson as he comes off the field, "Nice going, Leonard. Nice going, baby. Nice going, baby."
 As the clock counts down the final seconds, Stram can be heard through John Facenda's narration crowing "How sweet it is!".

Game summary
Chiefs head coach Hank Stram, who was also the team's offensive coordinator, devised an effective game plan against the Vikings. He knew Minnesota's secondary was able to play very far off receivers because Viking defensive ends Carl Eller and Jim Marshall knocked down short passes or put pressure on the quarterback. Stram decided to double-team Marshall and Eller; most of quarterback Len Dawson's completions would be short passes, and neither Marshall nor Eller knocked down any passes. Stram also concluded that the Vikings' aggressiveness on defense also made them susceptible to trap plays; Mike Garrett's rushing touchdown would come on a trap play. On offense, the Vikings' inside running game depended on center Mick Tingelhoff blocking linebackers. Stram put 285-pound Buck Buchanan or 295-pound Curley Culp nose to nose in front of Tingelhoff, who weighed only 235 pounds.  To Minnesota's credit, the NFL used the so-called light "greyhound" centers while the AFL used big centers.  It was a mismatch that disrupted the Vikings' running game; it also kept quarterback Joe Kapp from moving outside the pocket. Left defensive end Jerry Mays said of the odd line formation, "...we never played it that much before. Minnesota's recognition was destroyed." Wrote Dawson, "It was obvious that their offense had never seen a defense like ours." Minnesota would rush for only two first downs.

First quarter
The Vikings began the game by receiving the opening kickoff and marching from their own 20-yard line to the Kansas City 39-yard line with Kapp completing his first two passes for 36 yards. Kapp's next pass was also a completion but running back Bill Brown was slowed by linebacker Bobby Bell, then brought down by left defensive end Mays for a yard loss to make it third down, on which Kapp failed to connect with tight end John Beasley. Minnesota rushed for only 6 yards on the drive and chose to punt. The Chiefs then drove 42 yards in eight plays. Included was a 20-yard reception by wide receiver Frank Pitts after Vikings defensive back Ed Sharockman gambled trying to make an interception.  Kansas City then scored on placekicker Jan Stenerud's Super Bowl record 48-yard field goal. This record would stand for 24 years until broken by Steve Christie in Super Bowl XXVIII. (According to Dawson, the Vikings were shocked that the Chiefs would attempt a 48-yard field goal. Stenerud was among the first soccer-style placekickers in professional football. The others included brothers Charlie and Pete Gogolak. The soccer-style placekickers used the instep of the foot while the conventional professional football placekickers kicked straight on with their toes. "Stenerud was a major factor," Dawson said.) Minnesota then managed to reach midfield on its next drive, but chose to punt again.

On the first play of their ensuing drive, Dawson threw a 20-yard completion to Pitts, followed by a 9-yard pass to wide receiver Otis Taylor.

Second quarter
Four plays later, on the first play of the second quarter, a pass interference penalty on Sharockman nullified Dawson's third down incompletion and gave Kansas City a first down at the Minnesota 31-yard line. However, on third down and 4 at the 25-yard line, Vikings cornerback Earsell Mackbee broke up a deep pass intended for Taylor. Stenerud then kicked another field goal to increase the Chiefs' lead to 6–0.

On the second play of their next drive, Vikings wide receiver John Henderson fumbled the ball after catching a 16-yard reception, and Chiefs defensive back Johnny Robinson recovered the ball at the Minnesota 46-yard line. But defensive tackle Alan Page tackled running back Garrett for a 1-yard loss, and then safety Paul Krause intercepted Dawson's pass at the 7-yard line on the next play turning the ball back over to the Vikings.

However, the Vikings also could not take advantage of the turnover. Kapp's two incompletions and a delay of game penalty forced Minnesota to punt from its own 5-yard line. The Chiefs then took over at the Viking 44-yard line after punter Bob Lee's kick traveled only 39 yards. A 19-yard run by Pitts on an end around play fooled the overaggressive, overpursuing Viking defense to set up another field goal attempt by Stenerud, which was good to increase Kansas City's lead to 9–0.

On the ensuing kickoff, Vikings returner Charlie West fumbled the football, and Kansas City's Remi Prudhomme recovered it at the Minnesota 19-yard line. ("That was a key, key play," said Dawson.) Defensive end Jim Marshall sacked Dawson for an 8-yard loss on the first play of the drive; however, a 13-yard run on a draw play by running back Wendell Hayes and a 10-yard reception by Taylor gave the Chiefs a first down at the Vikings' 4. Three plays later, Garrett's five-yard touchdown run on a trap draw play, aided by pulling right guard Mo Moorman's block on Page that cleared a huge hole, gave Kansas City a 16–0 lead.  This play is forever known as the 65 Toss Power Trap.

West returned the ensuing kickoff 27 yards to the 32-yard line. On the first play of the drive, Kapp completed a 27-yard pass to Henderson to advance the ball to the Kansas City 41-yard line. However, the next three plays, Kapp threw two incompletions and was sacked by Chief defensive tackle Buck Buchanan for an eight-yard loss. On fourth down, kicker Fred Cox's 56-yard field goal attempt fell way short of the goal posts. For the first half, Minnesota rushed for only 24 yards and failed to convert any of five third downs.

To this point in the combined history of NFL and AFL championship games, including the first three Super Bowls, no team had lost a game when holding a lead of more than 10 points, no matter what time of the game it was. The Chiefs, when they were the Dallas Texans in their last game before they became the Chiefs, lost a 17–0 lead in the 1962 AFL Championship Game, but managed to defeat the Houston Oilers 20–17 in the second overtime. No team would lose such a lead and also lose the game until Super Bowl LI.

Third quarter
In the third quarter, the Vikings managed to build momentum.  After the Chiefs punted on their opening possession, Kapp completed four consecutive passes for 47 yards and rushed for seven yards. Minnesota also made its first third down conversion as it drove 69 yards in 10 plays to score on fullback Dave Osborn's four-yard rushing touchdown, reducing the lead to 16–7. However, Kansas City responded on its next possession with a six-play, 82-yard drive. Pitts picked up a key first down with a 7-yard left-to-right run on a reverse play. Then after a 15-yard personal foul penalty against the Vikings, Dawson hit Taylor with a short pass. Taylor caught the ball at the Minnesota 41-yard line, broke Earsell Mackbee's tackle, raced down the sideline, broke through Vikings' safety Karl Kassulke's tackle and scored the clinching touchdown on a 46-yard play.

Fourth quarter
The Vikings were demoralized after the game-breaking touchdown and the Chiefs' defense would continue to shut them down in the fourth quarter, forcing three interceptions on three Minnesota possessions to clinch the 23–7 victory. The defeat was total for the Vikings, as even their "Indestructible" quarterback Joe Kapp had to be helped off the field in the fourth quarter after being sacked by Chiefs defensive lineman Aaron Brown. Kapp was replaced by Gary Cuozzo. Fittingly, the Vikings' final play was an interception Cuozzo threw to cornerback Emmitt Thomas.

Kansas City running back and future University of Southern California Athletic Director Mike Garrett, the 1965 Heisman Trophy recipient, was the top rusher of the game, recording 11 carries for 39 yards and a touchdown. He also caught two passes for 25 yards and returned a kickoff for 18 yards. Taylor was the Chiefs' leading receiver with six catches for 81 yards and a touchdown. Kapp finished the game with 16 of 25 completions for 183 yards, with two costly interceptions. Henderson was the top receiver of the game with seven catches for 111 yards. The Chiefs defense completely shut down Minnesota's vaunted rushing attack. In the NFL championship game, Osborn had rushed for 108 yards while Kapp rushed for 57. In Super Bowl IV, however, the two rushed for a combined total of 24 yards. In addition, Kansas City's secondary held Minnesota All Pro receiver Gene Washington to one reception for 9 yards.

Referring to the Vikings' three interceptions, three fumbles, and six penalties, Vikings safety Karl Kassulke said, "We made more mental mistakes in one game than we did in one season." Kapp would never play again for the Vikings, as he would play out the option of his contract and sign with the Boston Patriots for the 1970 season.

Kansas City is, the only team in the Super Bowl era to win the title without allowing as much as 10 points in any postseason game.

Box score

Final statistics
Sources:The NFL's Official Encyclopedic History of Professional Football, (1973), p. 144, Macmillan Publishing Co. New York, NY, LCCN 73-3862, NFL.com Super Bowl IV, USA Today Super Bowl IV Play by Play, Super Bowl IV Play Finder KC, Super Bowl IV Play Finder Min

Statistical comparison

Individual leaders

1Completions/attempts
2Carries
3Long gain
4Receptions
5Times targeted

Records set
The following records were set or tied in Super Bowl IV, according to the official NFL.com boxscore and the ProFootball reference.com game summary. Some records have to meet NFL minimum number of attempts to be recognized. The minimums are shown (in parenthesis).

Starting lineups

Players' shares
As with the previous three Super Bowls, the players' shares were $15,000 each for the winning team and $7,500 each for the losing team. This was in addition to the league championship money earned a week earlier, approximately $8,000 each.

Officials
 Referee: John McDonough (AFL) #11
 Umpire: Lou Palazzi (NFL) #51
 Head Linesman: Harry Kessel (AFL) #34
 Line Judge: Bill Schleibaum (NFL) #28
 Back Judge: Tom Kelleher (NFL) #25
 Field Judge: Charlie Musser (AFL) #55

Note: A seven-official system was not used until

See also
 1969 NFL season
 1969 NFL playoffs
 1969 American Football League season
 1969 American Football League playoffs
 List of Super Bowl champions

References

External links
 
 
 
 
 
 https://www.pro-football-reference.com – Large online database of NFL data and statistics
 Super Bowl play-by-plays from USA Today (Last accessed September 28, 2005)
  (via the National Football League (NFL)'s official YouTube channel)

Kansas City Chiefs postseason
Minnesota Vikings postseason
Super Bowl
1969 National Football League season
1969 American Football League season
1970 in American football
1970 in sports in Louisiana
American football competitions in New Orleans
January 1970 sports events in the United States
1970s in New Orleans